Beryl E. Escott is a Canadian-born writer specializing in the history of the Women's Auxiliary Air Force. A native of Newfoundland, Escott was educated in Wales and England. She served in the Royal Air Force from 1961 to 1986.

RAF publications
 History of RAF Church, High Wycombe               Published by RAF BC              1967
 History of RAF High Wycombe                        Published by RAF BC              1968 Ed3'70
 Springfield Lodge, CinC's House                    Published by RAF BC              1969
 Art Works of Officers Mess RAF High Wycombe        Published by RAF BC              1969
 Story of Halton House                             Published by RAF Halton in       1984 Ed4'08

Civilian publications

References

Royal Air Force officers
British writers
Living people
Year of birth missing (living people)
People from Warwickshire
Canadian expatriates in the United Kingdom